The Great Merlini is a fictional detective created by Clayton Rawson.  He is a professional magician who appears in four locked room or impossible crime novels written in the late 1930s and early 1940s, as well as in a dozen short stories.

"His chronicler, free-lance writer Ross Harte, notes that Merlini hates the New York City Subway system, beer, inactivity, opera, golf, and sleep.  He is, on the other hand, highly partial to surf bathing, table tennis, puzzles, circuses, and Times Square, where he operates a magic shop.  Merlini's friendly rival is Inspector Homer Gavigan of Homicide, an intelligent man who is, nonetheless, amazed by the magician's feats."

Bibliography

Novels
 Death from a Top Hat (1938)
 The Footprints on the Ceiling (1939)
 The Headless Lady (1940)
 No Coffin for the Corpse (1942)

Short stories
Twelve short stories featuring Merlini were published in Ellery Queen's Mystery Magazine between 1946 and 1971. In 1979, they were collected under the title of The Great Merlini.
 The Clue of the Tattooed Man
 The Clue of the Broken Legs
 The Clue of the Missing Motive
 From Another World
 Off the Face of the Earth
 Merlini and the Lie Detector
 Merlini and the Vanished Diamonds
 Merlini and the Sound Effects Murder
 Nothing Is Impossible
 Miracles - All in the Day's Work
 Merlini and the Photographic Clue
 The World's Smallest Locked Room

Adaptations
At least two movies were made based on the Merlini books.  One of them, Miracles for Sale (1939), was based on Death from a Top Hat but had no character named Merlini—instead, Robert Young played "The Great Morgan".  The 1942 movie The Man Who Wouldn't Die, starring Lloyd Nolan, was based on No Coffin for the Corpse, but the Merlini character was replaced by Michael Shayne, a popular fictional private eye at the time, created by the writer Brett Halliday. Merlini was shown in a brief segment where he advises Shayne, and was played by an uncredited Charles Irwin.

A 30-minute pilot for a television series was directed by Ted Post in 1951, but no further episodes were made.  The Transparent Man, written by Rawson, starred Jerome Thor as The Great Merlini—who in this incarnation was a stage magician—with Barbara Cook as his assistant Julie and featuring E. G. Marshall as a criminal.

References

Fictional amateur detectives
Fictional stage magicians